Ponsei Thirunanipalli is one of the villages of Kidarankondan panchayat. It is located in Mayiladuthurai district and state of Tamil Nadu, under Poompuhar Assembly Constituency and Mayiladuthurai parliamentary Constituency.

Pincode-609304

The population is nearly 1500.

Nearby notable places
 Poombuhar
 Thirunallar-Sannishwaran Temple-Saturn Planet
 Fort Dansborg-Tharangambadi
 Mayiladuthurai
 Chidambaram-Natarajar Temple World's Center Point
 திருநனிபள்ளி Ponsei Natrunaiyappar Temple
 kizhapaerambalam-Kethu Temple
 Thiruvengadu Buthan Temple-Mercury Planet
 Vaitheeshwaran Temple-Chevvai Temple-Earth Mars

References

External links
 

Mayiladuthurai district